Bergen International Festival is an annual international music and cultural festival in Bergen, Norway.

Biography 
The Bergen International festival is the largest festival in the Nordic countries in its genre and has a large number of activities in music, dance, literature, visual arts, folklore, etc. The festival is held over fourteen days from the end of May to the start of June and is located in numerous places like the Grieg Hall, Haakon's Hall, Troldhaugen, Lysøen, Siljustøl as well as streets and town squares of Bergen. In the same time span the International Jazz Festival, Nattjazz, takes place in Bergen.

The first festival that started on 1 June 1953, exactly 55 years after its predecessor and source of inspiration, the first music festival in Norway Edvard Grieg's Bergen Music Festival starting on the 26 June 1898. The model was the Salzburg Festival, and the initiative came partly from opera singer Fanny Elstad. The original festival director was Frank Meidell Falch from 1951 to 1957. Christen Gran Bøgh, who died in 1955, also played a major role in the festival's first edition.

Grieg’s concerto in A minor

Edvard Grieg’s piano concerto in A minor is often called the signature work of the Festival, and has been performed at almost every Festival since 1953. Here are all the soloists:

  1953: Robert Riefling
  1954: Ivar Johnsen
  1955: Not performed
  1956: Grant Johannesen
  1957: Kjell Bækkelund
  1958: Ivar Johnsen
  1959: Robert Riefling
  1960: Hans Richter-Haaser
  1961: Grant Johannesen
  1962: Liv Glaser
  1963: Robert Riefling
  1964: Benny Dahl-Hansen
  1965: Grant Johannesen
  1966: Gina Bachauer
  1967: Jan Henrik Kayser
  1968: Svjatsolav Richter
  1969: Eva Knardahl
  1970: Vladimir Ashkenazy
  1971: Jens Harald Bratlie
  1972: Radu Lupu
  1973: Håkon Austbø
  1974: Robert Riefling
  1975: Einar Steen-Nøkleberg
  1976: Steffan Scheja
  1977: Jorunn Marie Bratlie
  1978: Emil Gilels
  1979: Geir Henning Braaten
  1980: Einar Henning Smebye
  1981: Karl Engel
  1982: András Schiff
  1983: Cécilie Ousset
  1984: Eva Knardahl
  1985: Bruno Leonardo Gelber
  1986: Roland Pöntinen
  1987: Bella Davidovich
  1988: Leif Ove Andsnes
  1989: Mark Zeltser
  1990: Lyubow Timofeyeva
  1991: John Kimura Parker
  1992: Michael Rudy
  1993: Leif Ove Andsnes
  1994: Lilya Silberstein
  1995: Lars Vogt
  1996: Håvard Gimse
  1997: Jean-Yves Thibaudet
  1998: Nils Mortensen
  1999: Noriko Ogawa
  2000: Peter Jablonski
  2001: Nikolai Luganskij
  2002: Leif Ove Andsnes
  2003: Håkon Austbø
  2004: Gunilla Süssmann
  2005: Anti Siirala
  2006: Rian de Waal
  2007: Percy Grainger/Pianola
  2008: Sigurd Slåttebrekk
  2009: Juho Pohjonen
  2010: Gabriela Montero
  2011: Ikke spilt
  2012: Christian Ihle Hadland
  2013: Marianna Shirinyan
  2014: Simon Trpceski
  2015: Ronald Brautigam

Musician in residence
 1997: Leif Ove Andsnes
 1998: Randi Stene
 1999: Christian Eggen
 2001: Det Norske Kammerorkester
 2003: Anne Sofie von Otter
 2004: Henning Kraggerud
 2005: Martin Fröst
 2006: Per Arne Glorvigen
 2007: Trio Mediæval
 2008: Bjarte Eike

References

External links 
 

Music festivals established in 1953
Music festivals in Norway
Festivals in Bergen
Classical music festivals in Norway
Cultural festivals in Norway
Music in Bergen
1953 establishments in Norway
Culture in Hordaland